Musalı is a village in the Mersin Province, Turkey. It is part of Toroslar district (which is an intracity district within Mersin city). It is at the north of the city center. The population of the village was 856  as of 2012.

References

Villages in Toroslar District